is a private university with its main campus at Mihama, Aichi, and other campuses at Nagoya and Handa, also in Aichi Prefecture, Japan. The school was founded as a junior college in 1953 and became a four-year college in 1957.

References

External links
 Official website

Educational institutions established in 1953
Private universities and colleges in Japan
Universities and colleges in Aichi Prefecture
1953 establishments in Japan
Mihama, Aichi
Handa, Aichi